Lordithon lunulatus is a rove beetle. It is a common insect in Europe. The mature adult is about 5 millimetres long. It has distinctively patterned elytra - these are shiny black  with pale patches at the outer front corners, and a pale margin at the rear. The thorax is broader at the rear, narrower at the front, shining and reddish brown. The head is long and shiny. The abdomen is largely reddish-brown, but the two rear segments are black. It is covered is pale hairs, and has black setae on its lateral margins. The legs are yellow, and the tarsi are elongated, with five segments on each. The antennae have eleven segments — the first to fourth, and the last are yellow; the others black.

The adult is found in bracket fungi in summer and autumn, where it preys on other insects that eat the fungus.

References

 Joy, Norman H. (1932) A Practical Handbook of British Beetles Vol. 1 p. 86 (where this species is listed as Bolitobius lunulatus)

External links

Tachyporinae
Beetles of Europe
Beetles described in 1760
Articles containing video clips
Taxa named by Carl Linnaeus